Jeremy Smith may refer to:
Jeremy Theron Smith a man charged with aggravated assault for wounding three women in Koreatown Dallas on 17 May 2022
Jeremy Smith (Royal Navy officer) (fl. 1660s), British sailor
Jeremy C. Smith (born 1959), British biophysicist
Jeremy Smith (American musician), lead vocalist and keyboardist for American band Days Difference
Jeremy Smith (Australian musician) (fl. early 1990s), Australian musician
Jeremy Smith (rugby league, born 1980), New Zealand rugby league footballer (Melbourne, St. George Illawarra, Cronulla-Sutherland, Newcastle)
Jeremy Smith (rugby league, born 1981), New Zealand rugby league footballer (Parramatta, South Sydney, Salford, Wakefield Trinity)
Jeremy Smith (cricketer) (born 1988), Tasmanian cricketer
Jeremy Smith (ice hockey) (born 1989), American ice hockey goaltender
Jeremy Smith (Australian footballer) (born 1973), Australian rules footballer
Jeremy Adam Smith (born 1970), author and blogger
Jeremy Smith (historian) (fl. 1990s–2010s)
Jeremy Irvine (born 1990), née Jeremy Smith, actor
Jeremy J. Smith (fl. 2000s–2010s), British philologist

See also
Jerry Smith (disambiguation)
Jeremiah Smith (disambiguation)